"The Witchfinders" is the eighth episode of the eleventh series of the British science fiction television programme Doctor Who. It was written by Joy Wilkinson and directed by Sallie Aprahamian, and was first broadcast on BBC One on 25 November 2018.

In the episode, the Thirteenth Doctor (Jodie Whittaker) travels to 17th century Lancashire, alongside her companions Graham O'Brien (Bradley Walsh), Ryan Sinclair (Tosin Cole), and Yasmin Khan (Mandip Gill), finding themselves in the middle of a witch hunt held by a local land owner.

The episode was watched by 7.21 million viewers, and received generally positive reviews from critics.

Plot 

The Thirteenth Doctor and her companions arrive in 1612 Lancashire near Pendle Hill. At a nearby village they find an old woman accused of witchcraft being dunked, and the Doctor tries to save her, but fails. She attempts to prevent further trials by pretending to be the Witchfinder General, fooling landowner and magistrate Becka Savage. King James arrives, complicating matters, as he assumes she is Graham's assistant. Meanwhile, Yasmin finds the old woman being buried by her grand-daughter, Willa Twiston, who is also Becka's cousin, and saves her from a tendril made of mud. The Doctor realises the cause of the witch hunt is of alien origin when recent victims begin to reanimate.

While her companions follow the reanimated corpses, the Doctor is accused of witchcraft when confronting Becka over her hiding something. The Doctor attempts to reason with James before being dunked, escaping from her bonds underwater. Afterwards she notes how Becka could not bear touching the tree used to dunk her. As her reanimated victims approach, Becka reveals that she was infected by an alien entity while chopping down the tree atop the Hill. Becka started the witch trials hoping to find a cure.

An alien entity takes over Becka's body. Speaking through her, the entity reveals herself to be queen of a race called the Morax. The tree Becka chopped down is in fact a disguised alien prison keeping the Morax war criminals within, its systems now damaged and malfunctioning. The escaping Morax intend that their king possess James and conquer Earth. The Doctor uses parts of the tree to save James and restore the prison systems. While the other Morax are forced out of their host bodies, the queen refuses to leave Becka's body. James kills them both. The following day, James tells the Doctor that all records of the events will be erased before he and Willa watch in surprise as the group leave in the TARDIS.

Continuity
Towards the end of the episode, when entering the TARDIS, the Doctor says "A brilliant man once said, 'any sufficiently advanced technology is indistinguishable from magic.'" This is a reference to the third of British science fiction writer Arthur C. Clarke's three laws, which was also referenced by the Seventh Doctor and his companion Ace in the episode "Battlefield," Captain Jack Harkness in the Torchwood episode "Immortal Sins," and to a degree by the Twelfth Doctor in the episode "The Girl Who Died."

Outside reference
Towards the end of the episode, when warning King James not to resume the witch trials, Graham partially quotes Quentin Tarantino's version of biblical verse Ezekiel 25:17, from his film Pulp Fiction.

Historical reference
When King James and Ryan talk in the forest, King James explained that his mother (Mary Queen of Scots) killed his father, a reference to the historical speculation.

Production 
Exterior scenes for "The Witchfinders" were filmed around Wales, and within Gosport, England, at the 17th century living museum of Little Woodham. Filming for the episode took place during February 2018.

In a 2021 interview, Wilkinson revealed the story had changed several times during development, beginning as more centered around the actual Pendle Witches, with King James being a later addition. The script had the working title of Daemonologie.

Broadcast and reception

Early release 
The episode was released to Amazon Prime subscribers three days before its BBC One broadcast, when the streaming service accidentally uploaded "The Witchfinders" to the slot for the seventh episode, "Kerblam!", instead of the seventh episode itself.

Ratings 
"The Witchfinders" was watched by 5.66 million viewers overnight, a share of 27.9% of the total United Kingdom TV audience, making it the fourth-highest overnight viewership for the night and the nineteenth-highest overnight viewership for the week on overnights across all UK channels. It received an official total of 7.21 million viewers across all UK channels, making it the 17th most watched programme of the week, and had an Audience Appreciation Index score of 81.

Critical response 
The episode was met with positive reviews, and Cumming's performance received praise. It holds an approval rating of 85% based on 27 reviews, and an average score of 7.54/10 on Rotten Tomatoes. The website's critical consensus reads, "'The Witchfinders' sparks excitement by highlighting familiar themes of Doctor Whos current season — and ignites that spark with a dramatic shift in focus."

Commercial releases

In print

A novelisation of this story written by Joy Wilkinson was released in paperback and digital formats 11 March 2021 as part of the Target Collection.

See also
 Lancashire Witches Walk
 Daemonologie, written by King James I
 Pendle witches

References

External links 

 
 
 

Television episodes set in the 17th century
2018 British television episodes
Cultural depictions of James VI and I
Doctor Who pseudohistorical serials
Doctor Who stories set on Earth
Lancashire in fiction
Television episodes set in England
Thirteenth Doctor episodes
Witch hunting in fiction
Television episodes about witchcraft